Cryptofilida is an order of small heterotrophic protists in the phylum Cercozoa. They are filose amoebae that lack cilia and gliding, and are instead characterized by movement through branching or unbranched granular filopodia that are appressed to the substrate during their feeding.

In studies on the impact of conventional soil management, Cryptofilida were identified as ecological indicators.

Phylogeny and taxonomy

Phylogeny
Cryptofilida is a clade inside Granofilosea, and is phylogenetically related to Limnofilida, a group with similar amoeboid protists. However, the exact relationships between the granofilosean clades is still unresolved. Two outcomes are shown here from the 2009 analysis that identified the group for the first time:

A more recent analysis shows this result:

Taxonomy
The order contains two families with one species each.
Family Mesofilidae 
Mesofila 
Mesofila limnetica 
Family Nanofilidae 
Nanofila 
Nanofila marina

References

External links

Cercozoa orders